Ethulia is a genus of Asian and African flowering plants in the daisy family.

 Species

References

Asteraceae genera
Vernonieae